Don Scott (16 August 1930 – 17 March 2002) was an  Australian rules footballer who played with Geelong in the Victorian Football League (VFL).

Notes

External links 

1930 births
2002 deaths
Australian rules footballers from Victoria (Australia)
Geelong Football Club players
Geelong West Football Club players